Call Over the Air (German: Ruf aus dem Äther) is a 1951 Austrian drama film directed by Georg C. Klaren and Georg Wilhelm Pabst and starring Oskar Werner, Lucia Scharf and Fritz Imhoff.

It was made at the Sievering Studios in Vienna with location shooting at the Dachstein in the Alps. The film's sets were designed by the art director Fritz Jüptner-Jonstorff. Although filming took place in 1948, it wasn't released for a further three years in either Austria or West Germany.

Cast
 Oskar Werner as Der Student  
 Lucia Scharf as Das Mädchen  
 Fritz Imhoff as Onkel Otto  
 Ernst Waldbrunn as Makkabi  
 Otto Wögerer as Der Alte 
 Heinz Moog as Wartanian 
 Ekkehard Arendt as Spitz  
 Fritz Berger as Maccaroni  
 Hermann Erhardt as Schiesser  
 Josef Gmeinder as Schlafmütze  
 Walter Ladengast as Der Geflickte  
 Jürg Medicus as Dechiffreur  
 Karl Ranninger as Kogler  
 Rudolf Rhomberg as Piefke  
 Evelyn Schroll as Regine Kogler  
 Toni van Eyck as Frau Kogler  
 Rudolf Vones as Funker

References

Bibliography 
 Fritsche, Maria. Homemade Men in Postwar Austrian Cinema: Nationhood, Genre and Masculinity. Berghahn Books, 2013.
 Eric Rentschler. The Films of G.W. Pabst: an extraterritorial cinema. Rutgers University Press, 1990.

External links 
 

1951 films
1951 drama films
Austrian drama films
1950s German-language films
Films directed by Georg C. Klaren
Films directed by G. W. Pabst
Films shot at Sievering Studios
Austrian black-and-white films